The Ferrari Colombo Engine was a petrol fueled, water cooled, carburetted 60° V12 engine designed by Gioacchino Colombo and produced in numerous iterations by Italian automaker Ferrari between 1947 and 1988. The maker's first homegrown engine, its linear successor is the Lampredi V12, which it far outlived, the last Lampredi being made in 1959.

Colombo, who had previously designed Alfa Romeos for Enzo Ferrari, placed bore centres at 90 mm apart, allowing for significant expansion. Displacements ranged from the diminutive  debut that powered the 125S racer to the  unit in the 1986 412i grand tourer. Significant updates were made in 1963 for the 330 series, featuring a redesigned block with wider, 94 mm, bore spacing.

Enzo Ferrari had long admired the V12 engines of Packard, Auto Union, and Alfa Romeo (where he was long employed), but his first car, the 1940 Auto Avio Costruzioni 815, used a Fiat derived straight-8. Development of the V12 Colombo engine continued long after Colombo had been replaced by Aurelio Lampredi as the company's marquee engine designer. Although the Lampredi V12 was a real force for the company, it was Colombo's engine which powered Ferrari to the forefront of high-performance automobiles through the 1950s and 1960s.



125

The first Ferrari-designed engine was the  V12 125, the work of Gioachino Colombo and assistants Giuseppe Busso and Luigi Bazzi. The engine's name, and the car powered by it, the 125 S sports racer, were derived from the tiny    by  cylinders. The single overhead camshaft 60° V design had one cam on each cylinder bank, two valves per cylinder, and three 30DCF Weber carburetors. A 7.5:1 compression ratio yielded  at 6800 rpm. First appearing May 11, 1947, the engine allowed the company to claim six victories in 14 races that year. 

Colombo and Ferrari had designed the engine with Formula One regulations in mind, and introduced it the next year in the company's first F1 car, the 125 F1. However, the single-stage Roots-type supercharger was incapable of producing the high-end power required to compete with the strong eight-cylinder Alfa Romeo 158 and four-cylinder Maserati 4CLT. Nevertheless, strong driving and a nimble chassis allowed the company to place third in its first outing, at the Valentino Grand Prix on September 5, 1948 and the company persevered in racing.

For 1949, the engine was further modified with dual overhead camshafts (though still two valves per cylinder) and a two-stage supercharger. This combination gave the car better top-end performance and the resulting  gave it five Grand Prix wins. Development continued the following year, but the problematic superchargers were dropped in favor of larger displacement and Lampredi's 275 engine superseded the original Colombo design.

Applications:
 1947 Ferrari 125 S — 
 1948 Ferrari 125 F1 — Single supercharger, 
 1949–1950 Ferrari 125 F1 — Dual-stage supercharger,

58.8 mm stroke

The early 166, 195, and 212 cars used Colombo V12s of varying sizes.

250
One of the most common Colombo engines is the 250, which debuted in 1952 in the 250S and lasted through the 1963 330 America.

Beginning with the famous 250 TR, "Testa Rossa" racing car, Ferrari began a new series of modifications to the Colombo 250 engine. The spark plugs were moved to the outside of the cylinder head, near the exhausts. This enabled Ferrari to introduce separate individual intake ports to use with the six two barrel Weber carburetors. Four cylinder head bolts per cylinder were introduced (instead of three) to cope with the added power.

These changes eventually were incorporated into the Ferrari road cars, beginning with the 250 GT SWB and the 250 GT Series II Pininfarina cars.

275
The final  Colombo Ferrari was the 275.

330
The 1960 400 Superamerica replaced the previous model's Lampredi engine with a  Colombo. It diverged from the standard  stroke with a  stroke and  bore.

Although the 1963 330 series also used a  engine with the same bore and stroke as the 400 Superamerica, this  engine was quite different. It used a wider bore spacing, paving the way for future displacement increases. The spark plugs were moved and a new water pump was used. The dynamo on the prior versions was replaced by an alternator.

Four-cam
The Colombo V12 was substantially reworked for 1967's 275 GTB/4. It still used two valves per cylinder, but dual overhead cams were now used as well. In a departure from previous Ferrari designs, the valve angle was reduced three degrees to 54° for a more-compact head. The dual camshafts also allowed the valves to be aligned "correctly" (perpendicular to the camshaft) instead of offset as in SOHC Ferraris. It was a dry-sump design with a huge  capacity.

365
A reworked engine with four camshafts was used in the GT/4 models.
The 365 GTB/4 Daytona was the only 365 engined car featuring dry sump lubrication.

Applications:
 1966–1967 365 California
 1968–1970 365 GTC, 365 GTS
 1968–1972 365 GT 2+2
 1968–1973 365 GTB/4 Daytona, 365 GTS/4 Daytona
 1971–1972 365 GTC/4
 1972–1976 365 GT4 2+2

400, 412
The carburetors were replaced with Bosch K-Jetronic fuel injection in 1979.

Applications:
 1976–1979 400
 1979–1985 400i
 1986–1988 412i

See also
List of Ferrari engines

References

Bibliography
 

Colombo
Formula One engines
Gasoline engines by model
V12 engines